The Royal House of Grace International Church is a church in Nigeria that was founded in 1992 by Apostle Zilly Aggrey. The church has its headquarters at New GRA, Port Harcourt, Rivers State.

History

The Royal House of Grace International Church started in 30 October 1992 with 15 persons in attendance. Over the years the church grew and there was a need for a bigger auditorium because of the growth. The church moved to their current headquarters in 1997.

References 

1992 establishments in Nigeria
1990s establishments in Rivers State
Churches completed in 1992
Churches in Port Harcourt
Pentecostal churches in Nigeria
20th-century religious buildings and structures in Nigeria